Aquatic biomonitoring is the science of inferring the ecological condition of rivers, lakes, streams, and wetlands by examining the organisms (fish, invertebrates, insects, plants, and algae) that live there. While aquatic biomonitoring is the most common form of biomonitoring, any ecosystem can be studied in this manner.

Purpose 

Aquatic biomonitoring is an important tool for assessing aquatic life forms and their ecosystems. Monitoring aquatic life can also be beneficial in understanding land ecosystems.

Aquatic biomonitoring can reveal the overall health and status of the environment, can detect environmental trends and how different stressors will affect those trends, and can be used to evaluate the effects that various environmental activities may have on the overall health of the environment. Water pollution and general stresses to aquatic life have a major impact on the environment. The main sources of pollution to oceans, rivers, and lakes are human caused events or activities, such as sewage, oil spills, surface runoff, littering, ocean mining, and nuclear waste. Rapid changes to an environment, like, pollution, can alter ecosystems and community assemblages, and endanger species that live in or close to water. Many aquatic species also serve as food sources for terrestrial species. Thus, aquatic ecosystems are interconnected with their adjacent terrestrial ecosystem.

Indicator organisms 

Aquatic invertebrates, most popularly the larvae of the caddis fly sp., are responsive to climate change, low levels of pollution and temperature change. As a result, they have the longest history of use in biomonitoring programs.  Additionally, macroscopic species: frogs, fish, and some plant species, as well as, many forms of microscopic life, like bacteria and protozoa are used as indicator organisms in a variety of applications, storm water run-off among them. Amphibians have typically been used as macroscopic indicators as they are considered to be sensitive to change due to their permeable skin, however some research indicates this may only be true in the case of phenols.

Many species of Macroalgae (including Cyanobacteria, though not technically a true algae) are also used in biomonitoring for both aquatic and marine environments, as their short lifespan makes them very reactive to changes.

Common methods 
A biomonitoring assessment typically requires two or more sets of data . First, a baseline dataset that, ideally, defines the environment in its natural state, or default state. This is used to compare with any datasets that follow.

Methods employed in aquatic biomonitoring 
 monitoring and assessing aquatic species (incl. plants, animals, and bacteria)
 monitoring the behavior of certain aquatic species and assessing any changes in species behavior
 analyzing the biochemical make-up of the waterbody, and its potential influence on the species that depend on it.

Common tools of ecological and biological assessments 
 Bioassays. Test organisms are exposed to an environment and their response is measured. Typical organisms used in bioassays are certain species of plants, bacteria, fish, water fleas (Daphnia), and frogs.
 Community assessments. Also called biosurveys. An entire community of organisms is sampled to see what types of taxa remain. In aquatic ecosystems, these assessments often focus on invertebrates, algae, macrophytes (aquatic plants), fish, or amphibians. Rarely, other large vertebrates (reptiles, birds, and mammals) may be considered.
 Online biomonitoring devices. One example uses chemoreceptor cells of mollusks and similar animals to monitor their coastal and fresh water habitats. Different types of animals are used for this purpose either in the lab or in the field. The study of the opening and closing activity of clams' valves is an example of one possible way to monitor in-situ the quality of fresh and coastal waters.

Variables considered

Water quality 
Water quality is graded both on appearance, for example: clear, cloudy, full of algae, and chemistry. Determining the specific levels of enzymes, bacteria, metals, and minerals found in water is extremely important. Some contaminants, such as metals and certain organic wastes, can be lethal to individual creatures and could thereby ultimately lead to extinction of certain species. This could affect both aquatic and land ecosystems and cause disruption in other biomes and ecosystems.

Water temperature 
Water body temperature is one of the most ubiquitous variables collected in aquatic biomonitoring. Temperatures at the water surface, through the water column, and in the lowest levels of the water body (benthic zone) can all provide insight into different aspects of an aquatic ecosystem. Water temperature is directly affected by climate change and can have negative affects on many aquatic species, such as salmon.

Community make-up 
Species community assemblages and changes there in can help researchers to infer changes in the health of an ecosystem. In typical unpolluted temperate streams of Europe and North America, certain insect taxa predominate. Mayflies (Ephemeroptera), caddisflies (Trichoptera), and stoneflies (Plecoptera) are the most common insects in these undisturbed streams. In contrast, in rivers disturbed by urbanization, agriculture, forestry, and other perturbations, flies (Diptera), and especially midges (family Chironomidae) predominate.

Local geology 
Surface water can be affected by sub-surface influences stemming from local geology. An example of this influence is the infiltration of heavy metals, such as Manganese.

See also 

 Ecology portal
 Bioindicator
 Biological integrity
 Biological monitoring working party (a measurement procedure)
 Indicator species
 Water pollution

References

External links 

 Biological Assessment of Water Quality – US EPA
 US Bioassessment and Biocriteria Programs for Streams and Wadeable Rivers - US EPA

Aquatic ecology
Bioindicators
Environmental science
Measurement of biodiversity
Water pollution